Krayan is a district in Nunukan Regency, North Kalimantan, Indonesia.

It is located on the west side of Nunukan Regency and borders the state of Sabah and Sarawak in Malaysia. The district consists of 65 villages, while the main town is Long Bawan. The population is estimated to be 6,824 in 2014, and the majority are of the Lundayeh ethnic group.

Due to the remote location, the district is usually accessible via air, that is from Nunukan Airport to Juvai Semaring Airport in Long Bawan.

Economy
The district is renowned as a major rice producer in Nunukan regency, specifically of a variety called Adan rice, and is marketed widely in nearby Malaysia and Brunei. The district also produces mountain salts, collected from salt springs located in the district.

Some part of the Kayan Mentarang National Park area is located in this district.

References

Districts of North Kalimantan